Art of the Olympians (AOTO) is an organization and program of Olympian and Paralympian artists that promotes the Olympic ideals of values, integrity, character, respect, honor, and work ethic through exhibitions and educational programs. It puts on traveling exhibitions, runs workshops, organizes talks at schools, to show and discuss the connection between sport, art, and the Olympics. AOTO previously operated a museum.

AOTO is a program of the non-profit Al Oerter Foundation.

History

Art of the Olympians was founded in 2006 by American Olympic gold medalist discus thrower and artist Al Oerter, who died in 2007. In 2006, the organization put on a touring exhibition of Art by Olympians. Art of the Olympians put on an exhibition at the 2008 Summer Olympics in Beijing, China.  AOTO also held a 2008 exhibition at the Rauschenberg Gallery, Edison College in Fort Myers, Florida.

In January 2010, the organization opened the Art of the Olympians Museum and the Al Oerter Center for Excellence in downtown Fort Myers, Florida.

In February 2010 Art of the Olympians held an exhibition at the XXI Olympic Winter Games in Vancouver. In 2011, graphic artist and former long jumper Bob Beamon became the CEO of the Art of the Olympians Museum and Gallery.

During the 2012 London summer Olympics AOTO held two international exhibitions in the United Kingdom.  The first was held at the University College of London and the second was held in Torbay on the south coast of England.

On July 16, 2013, CEO Bob Beamon released an open letter directed to the museum's board announcing his resignation.  On July 17, after 3 and a half years, the Art of the Olympians museum and the Al Oerter Center for Excellence closed its doors. On the AOTO website they posted an announcement: "It's time to reorganize and restructure the foundation.  A new direction focused on National and International Exhibitions programs will further the vision of the founder." Cathy Oerter, Al Oerter's widow, is currently the CEO of Art of the Olympians.

In December 2015, Roald Bradstock became the Executive Director of the Al Oerter Foundation (AOF) and Art of the Olympians.  And on December 2, Prince Albert ll of Monaco became the Trustee of the Al Oerter Foundation and Art of the Olympians.

In March 2016, Bradstock was interviewed on BBC Radio Two and then CNN International World Sport.  He announced that AOTO was marking their ten-year anniversary by launching a global campaign and search for new Olympian and Paralympian artists. 

On April 25, 2017, International Olympic Committee President Thomas Bach appointed Bradstock to the Olympic Culture and Heritage Commission.

On September 12, 2018 The World Olympians Association (WOA) announced the formation of a new WOA Arts Committee called "OLY Arts". Roald Bradstock was appointed the Chair of the new Committee. Fellow AOTO artists Emanuela Pierantozzi and Shane Gould joined Bradstock on the Arts Committee along with WOA President Joël Bouzou, WOA Executive Committee Member Natalie Cook and Olympian artists Pat Burgener (musician) and Takahiro Fujimoto (actor). Diane de Coubertin - granddaughter of Pierre de Coubertin, founder of the modern Olympic Games - and Francis Gabet, Director of the Olympic Foundation for Culture and Heritage were the final two other Committee members.

Olympian artists 
Numerous Olympians and Paralympians have contributed works to the foundation:
 Rink Babka – Painting
 Carl Borack – Film / Video / Photography
 Roald Bradstock – Painting / Drawing / Collage / Performance Art
 Greg Burns – Painting
 Chris Coleman – Photography
 Skip Cutting – Painting
 Joseph Dube – Painting
 Jean-Blaise Evéquoz – Painting
 Peggy Fleming – Painting
 Simon Goody – Painting
 Shane Gould – Photography
 Martin Hagen – Sculpture 
 Florence Griffith-Joyner – Painting
 Kader Klouchi – Painting
 Bill Kund – Photography 
 Queen Kyomo – Dancing
 Nancy Lewington – Photography
 Vincent Mathews – Mixed Media
 Lucia Medzihradská – Mixed Media
 Tony Moore – Poet
 Cameron Myler – Photography
  Al Oerter – Painting
 Emanuela Pierantozzi – Sculpture
 Peter Schifrin – Sculpture
 Kate Schmidt – Painting
 John Stillings – Painting
 Allison Wagner – Painting
 Larry Young – Sculpture
 Wojciech Zablocki – Watercolor
 Lynda Blutriech – Photography
 Robin Cousins – Performer 
 Neil Eckersley – Painter, Digital Artist 
 Kevin McMahon – Digital Media 
 Tasha Danvers – Painter, Singer 
 Chris Channon – Poet 
 Breaux Greer – Photography 
 Brenden Reilly – Drawing, Painting 
 Bob Beamon – Graphic Artist 
 Amy Acuff – Model, Painter 
 Rafer Johnson – Actor 
 Gary Visconti – Painter
 Shevon Stoddart – Singer
 Birgit Fischer – Photography
 Eric Josjö – Photography
 Jamie Nieto – Actor, Writer, Director
 Alex Fong – Singer, Actor
 Michelle Campi – Painter, Poet
 Prince Hubertus of Hohenlohe-Langenburg – Photographer, Singer
 Cheung Ho Lun – Painter
 Kevin Young – Drawing
 Corinna West – Poetry
 Pauline Gardiner – Painter
 Jennifer Chandler – Painter
 Reynaldo Brown – Photography
 Shannon Miller – Writer
 Lanny Barnes – Drawing
 John Herbert – Graphic Design
 Ben Nighthorse Campbell – Jewelry
 Joseph Joyce – Painter
 Michael Murray - Painter

Trustee
 Prince Albert II of Monaco

Board of directors
The foundation has a board of directors:
 Cathy Oerter
 Markus Sherry 
 Emanuela Pierantozzi
 Anita DeFrantz
 Kevin Murphy
 Jimmy Mellado
 Edward Stransenback
 Jack Scharr
 Marc Serota

Executive Directors
CEO – Cathy Oerter
Executive Director – Roald Bradstock

References

External links 
30-minute documentary about Art of the Olympians

Arts organizations established in 2006
2006 establishments in Florida
Arts organizations based in Florida
Fort Myers, Florida